HSwMS Vega (T125) was a Swedish Navy Spica-class, torpedo-armed, fast attack craft (FAC).

Design 
The hull was made of steel, unlike some other contemporary designs which used plywood. Although the boat had a relatively small hull and displacement, this provided a stable platform. The Bridge and Operations Room were located at the rolling and stamping centre of the ship which further improved stability for the crew especially in high seas. The boats were fitted with an NBC support system where the hull could be closed down in the event of having to operate in a nuclear fall-out area.

Construction and career 
The vessel was one of three constructed in the 1960s by Karlskronavarvet, the other two being HSwMS Castor (T124) and HSwMS Virgo (T126). Three similar vessels were built by Götaverken AB at Hisingen. She was launched on 12 November 1966.

The vessel was taken out of service on 1 November 1989.

References 

Ships of the Swedish Navy
1966 ships
Spica-class torpedo boats (Sweden)

de:Spica-Klasse
it:Classe Spica (motocannoniera)